Bernd Herzsprung (born March 22, 1942 in Hamburg, Germany) is a German television actor.

Herzsprung completed his acting training with Joseph Offenbach and then played in theaters in Hamburg (including the Deutsches Schauspielhaus in The Captain of Köpenick with Werner Hinz, the Ernst Deutsch Theater in Tom Stoppard's Rosencrantz and Guildenstern Are Dead) and other cities. On stage, his domain is the Boulevard theatre (Charley's Aunt).

Other movies followed, like The Flying Classroom in 1973 and Deutschlandlied (Ernst Witzel, 1984).

But Herzsprung was best known for his television roles. Since the late 1960s he played primarily in crime series such as Dem Täter auf der Spur, Der Kommissar, Derrick, Der Alte, Sonderdezernat K1, Ein Fall für zwei or Tatort. Since 1978 he played in the ZDF - TV series SOKO 5113 and 1994 he changed to the series Freunde fürs Leben (until 2000). In the ARD television series Familie Dr. Kleist, he played the role of the mayor of Eisenach. In the comedy Hengstparade he played alongside Christiane Hörbiger and Michael Mendl.

Herzsprung was married from 1979 until 2008. Of his two daughters with Barbara Engel, Hannah Herzsprung is also an actress.

In 2011 he was a candidate in the RTL format Let's Dance. On 20 April 2011, he was eliminated after a samba in sixth position.

Selected filmography
  (1967)
 The Twins from Immenhof (1973)
 The Flying Classroom (1973)
 Derrick - Season 2, Episode 3: "Angst" (1976, TV)
 SOKO 5113 (1978–1992, TV series)
 Derrick - Season 6, Episode 9: "Ein Kongreß in Berlin" (1979, TV)
 Derrick - Season 8, Episode 2: "Der Kanal" (1981, TV)
  (1981)
 Deutschlandlied (1984)
 Eine Frau für gewisse Stunden (1985)
 Goldene Zeiten (2006)
  (2007)
  (2014)

References

External links

Personal Site 

1942 births
Living people
German male television actors
German male stage actors
Male actors from Hamburg
German male film actors
20th-century German male actors
21st-century German male actors